Rueda is a village and municipality in the province of Valladolid, part of the autonomous community of Castile-Leon, Spain. 

It is located 30 km southwest of the provincial capital, the city of Valladolid.
The population is 1.614
This locality is also the center for the wine denomination Rueda (DO).

The region produces white wines made with grape varieties like: Verdejo, Viura, Sauvignon blanc, while the authorised red varieties are Tempranillo, Cabernet Sauvignon, Merlot and Garnacha.

See also
Rueda (DO)
Cuisine of the province of Valladolid

References

External links 
The wine region DO Rueda

Municipalities in the Province of Valladolid